Robert Eugene Rundle (1915 - October 9, 1963) was an American chemist and crystallographer. He was a professor at Iowa State University and fellow of the American Physical Society.

Early life and education 
Rundle was born in Orleans, Nebraska in 1915. He attended University of Nebraska  where he completed a bachelor of science in 1937 and a master's degree in 1938. He completed a Ph.D. in 1941 at the California Institute of Technology. His advisors were Linus Pauling and J. Holmes Sturdivant.

Career and research 
Rundle joined Iowa State University as an assistant professor of chemistry. From 1945 to 1946, he worked at Princeton University before returning to Iowa State University as a full professor. His research was focused on x-ray diffraction by crystals, inorganic solid-state chemistry, intermetallic and interstitial compounds, hydrogen-bonded substances, compounds of uranium and thorium, and electron-deficient compounds. He was a member of the American Crystallographic Association and served as the president of the organization in 1958. He was a member of the American Association of University Professors.

Awards and honors 
Rundle was a fellow of the American Physical Society.

Personal life 
Rundle died from a stroke in Iowa Methodist Hospital on October 9, 1963. He was survived by his wife and three sons.

References 

1915 births
1963 deaths
People from Harlan County, Nebraska
Scientists from Nebraska
20th-century American chemists
University of Nebraska alumni
Iowa State University faculty
California Institute of Technology alumni
American crystallographers
Fellows of the American Physical Society
Presidents of the American Crystallographic Association
Solid state chemists